Indirect presidential elections were held in Bangladesh on 22 April 2013 following the death of Zillur Rahman on 20 March 2013.

Background
President Zillur Rahman died on 20 March in Singapore after being flown there with an illness. Parliamentary speaker Abdul Hamid took over in an interim capacity.

At that time, Social protests had turned deadly in Bangladesh as a result of delayed prosecutions and convictions for war crimes committed during the Bangladesh War of Independence. The 2014 general election was also going to be on the new president's agenda. The opposition Bangladesh Nationalist Party and its allies said they would boycott the election if it was not held under a neutral interim government. However, the ruling Awami League's leader Sheikh Hasina said her government would preside over the electoral process.

Election
Hamid won the election unopposed through a parliamentary vote. S.M. Asaduzzman, a director of the election commission, said: "Abdul Hamid has won the election uncontested. The chief election commissioner declared him as the winner today."

References

Uncontested elections
2013 elections in Bangladesh
Bangladesh
2013 in Bangladesh
Presidential elections in Bangladesh
April 2013 events in Bangladesh